This list of Brown University faculty includes notable current and former professors, lecturers, fellows, and administrators of Brown University, an Ivy League university located in Providence, Rhode Island. Among the awards received by faculty, fellows, and staff are six Nobel Prizes, nine Pulitzer Prizes, and 17 MacArthur Fellowships.

Nobel laureates 

 Leon Neil Cooper, Nobel laureate (Physics, 1972), father of superconductivity, and developer of the BCM theory of synaptic plasticity in neuroscience; Thomas J. Watson, Sr. Professor of Physics
 John M. Kosterlitz, Nobel laureate (2016, Physics), for the Kosterlitz-Thouless transition (condensed matter physics); Harrison E. Farnsworth Professor of Physics (1982–)
 Lars Onsager, Nobel laureate (Chemistry 1968), for discovering Onsager reciprocal relations, Research Instructor in Chemistry (1928–33)
 Vernon L. Smith, Nobel laureate (2002, Economic Sciences), for developing empirical and scientific methods into economic research; Professor of Economics (1967–68)
 George Snell, Nobel laureate (1980, Physiology or Medicine), for discovering the genetic bases of immunological reactions
George Stigler, Nobel laureate (1982, Economic Sciences), on the influence of government regulation on the economy; Professor of Economics (1946–47)

MacArthur Fellows 

 Susan E. Alcock – Professor of Classics, Director of the Institute for Archaeology and the Ancient World; MacArthur Fellow (2000)
 Shirley Brice Heath – Professor-at-Large; MacArthur Fellow (1984)
Mari Jo Buhle – Professor Emerita of American Studies; MacArthur Fellow (1991)
Benedict Gross – Associate Professor of Mathematics (1982–85); MacArthur Fellow (1986)
John Imbrie – Professor Emeritus of Geological Sciences; MacArthur Fellow (1981)
Jacqueline Jones – Clare Boothe Luce Visiting Professor (1988–90); MacArthur Fellow (1999)
Stephen Houston – Dupee Family Professor of Social Science, Professor of Anthropology; MacArthur Fellow (2008)
Robert Kates – University Professor Emeritus; MacArthur Fellow (1981)
John Keene – Visiting Assistant Professor (2001–02); MacArthur Fellow (2018)
Ibram X. Kendi – Visiting Scholar and Visiting Assistant Professor of Africana Studies (2013–14); MacArthur Fellow (2021)
Deborah Meier – Senior Fellow (1995-1997), Annenberg Institute; MacArthur Fellow (1987)
David Mumford – Professor Emeritus of Applied Mathematics, recipient of the Fields Medal, MacArthur Fellow (1987)
David Pingree – University Professor and Professor of the History of Mathematics and of Classics, MacArthur Fellow (1981)
 Gregory Schopen – Rush C. Hawkins Professor of Religious Studies, MacArthur Fellow (1985)
 Jesse Shapiro – George S. and Nancy B. Parker Professor of Economics (2015–2021); MacArthur Fellow (2020)
John Edgar Wideman – Asa Messer Professor Emeritus of Africana Studies and Literary Arts; MacArthur Fellow (1993)
C. D. Wright – Israel J. Kapstein Professor of English; MacArthur Fellow (2004)

Pulitzer Prize recipients 

 Bernard Bailyn – Charles K. Colver Lecturer (1965); recipient of the 1968 Pulitzer Prize for History and 1987 Pulitzer Prize for History; recipient of the 2010 National Humanities Medal
 Richard Eberhart – Phi Beta Kappa Poet (1957); recipient of the 1966 Pulitzer Prize for Poetry
 Forrest Gander – Professor of English and Comparative Literature; recipient of the 2019 Pulitzer Prize for Poetry, Be With
 David Kertzer (A.B. 1969) – Paul Dupee University Professor of Social Science; recipient of the 2015 Pulitzer Prize for Biography or Autobiography, The Pope and Mussolini
 Philip Levine – Visiting Writer (1985); recipient of the 1995 Pulitzer Prize for Poetry, The Simple Truth
 Amy Lowell – Marshall Woods Lecturer (1921); recipient of the 1926 Pulitzer Prize for Poetry, What's O'Clock
 Paula Vogel – Adele Kellenberg Seaver ’49 Professor of Creative Writing (1984–2008); recipient of the 1998 Pulitzer Prize for Drama, How I Learned to Drive
 Gordon S. Wood – Alva O. Way University Professor and Professor of History; recipient of the 1993 Pulitzer Prize for History, The Radicalism of the American Revolution

Applied sciences 

 Linda Abriola – Joan Wernig and E. Paul Sorensen Professor of Engineering
Vicki Colvin – Vernon K. Krieble Professor of Chemistry and Engineering and Director of the Center for Biomedical Engineering
Tejal A. Desai (Sc.B. 1994) – Sorensen Family Dean of Engineering (2022–)
Alan Needleman – Florence Pirce Grant University Professor of Mechanics of Solids and Structures (1975–2009)
Arto Nurmikko – L. Herbert Ballou University Professor of Engineering
Michael Ortiz – Professor of Engineering (1984–95)
Christopher Rose – Professor of Engineering (2014–)
Subra Suresh – Professor of Engineering (1983–93); current President of Nanyang Technological University, former President of Carnegie Mellon University and former Director of the NSF

Humanities 
Amanda Anderson – Andrew W. Mellon Professor of Humanities
Shadi Bartsch –W. Duncan MacMillan II Professor of Classics
 Shahzad Bashir – Aga Khan Professor of Islamic Humanities
Shaye J. D. Cohen – Samuel Ungerleider Professor of Judaic Studies and Professor of Religious Studies (1991–2001)
Rey Chow – Andrew W. Mellon Professor of Humanities (2000–09)
Peter van Dommelen – Professor of Archaeology and the Ancient World and Anthropology
Beshara Doumani – Mahmoud Darwish Professor of Palestinian Studies, President of Birzeit University
David Estlund – Lombardo Family Professor of the Humanities
James L. Fitzgerald – St. Purander Das Distinguished Professor Emeritus of Classics
Carlos Fuentes – Professor-at-Large in the Department of Hispanic Studies; widely considered the most influential author of the Spanish-speaking world since Jorge Luis Borges
 Leela Gandhi – John Hawkes Professor of the Humanities and English
Dwight B. Heath – Research Professor of Anthropology; foremost anthropological researcher and scholar in field of alcohol studies
Stephen Houston – Dupee Family Professor of Social Science, Professor of Anthropology
Adrienne Keene – Joukowsky Family Assistant Professor of American Studies; Native American academic and activist
David Konstan – John Rowe Workman Distinguished Professor Emeritus of Classics and of Comparative Literature (1987–2010)
Hans Kurath – Professor of Germanics and Linguistics (1931–46); known for publishing the first linguistic atlas of the US Linguistic Atlas of New England, recipeint of the Loubat Prize
Jacob Neusner – Professor of Judaic Studies (1968–89)
Adi Ophir – Mellon Visiting Professor of Humanities and Middle East Studies
Dom Illtyd Trethowan – Visiting Professor in Theology
Peter van Dommelen – Joukowsky Family Professor of Archaeology and Professor of Anthropology

Africana studies 

Chinua Achebe – David and Marianna Fisher University Professor and Professor of Africana Studies, Nigerian novelist, poet, and critic; author of Things Fall Apart, the most widely read book in modern African literature
Ama Ata Aidoo – Visiting Professor of Africana Studies and Literary Arts (2004–09); Ghanaian novelist and playwright, one of Africa's best-known female writers
George Houston Bass – Professor of Theater Arts and Afro-American Studies
Keisha N. Blain – Professor of Africana Studies and of History
B. Anthony Bogues – Asa Messer Professor of Humanities and Critical Theory, Professor of Africana Studies, Director of the Center for the Study of Slavery and Justice, Professor of History of Art and Architecture
Michael Eric Dyson – Assistant Professor of American Civilization and Afro-American Studies (1993–95)
Lewis Gordon – Professor of Africana Studies (1997–2004)
Matthew Pratt Guterl – Professor of Africana Studies and American Studies
Wyclef Jean – Visiting Fellow in Africana Studies (2010–11)
Ibram X. Kendi – Visiting Scholar and Visiting Assistant Professor of Africana Studies (2013–14)
Adrienne Kennedy – Visiting Associate Professor (1979–80)
George Lamming – Visiting Professor of Africana Studies and Literary Arts; Barbadian author, In the Castle of My Skin, Natives of My Person
Judy Richardson – Distinguished Visiting Lecturer of Africana Studies
 Noliwe Rooks –  L. Herbert Ballou University Professor of Africana Studies
Tricia Rose (A.M. 1987, Ph.D. 1993) – Chancellor's Professor of Africana Studies, Associate Dean of the Faculty for Special Initiatives, Director of the Center for the Study of Race and Ethnicity in America
Greg Tate – Visiting Professor of Africana Studies (2012)
John Edgar Wideman – Asa Messer Professor Emeritus of Africana Studies and Literary Arts; two-time PEN/Faulkner Award winner

English and Literary Arts 

 Robert Coover – T.B. Stowell Professor Emeritus in Literary Arts (1981–2012)
Robert Creeley – Professor of English; poet associated with the Black Mountain poets
Brian Evenson – Professor of Literary Arts (2003–15)
Forrest Gander – Professor of English and Comparative Literature; recipient of the Pulitzer Prize
 Michael S. Harper – Professor of English; first Poet Laureate of the State of Rhode Island
John Hawkes – Professor of English (1958–88); author, The Blood Oranges, Second Skin
Edwin Honig – Professor of English and Comparative Literature (1957–82)
Michael Ondaatje – Visiting Professor (1990)
 Barbara Herrnstein Smith – Distinguished Professor of English (2003–11)
Paula Vogel – Adele Kellenberg Seaver ’49 Professor of Creative Writing (1984–2008); Pulitzer Prize–winning playwright
Rosmarie Waldrop – Visiting Scholar of Literary Arts
 C. D. Wright – Israel J. Kapstein Professor of English; MacArthur Fellow (2004)
 Arnold Weinstein – Edna and Richard Salomon Distinguished Professor of Comparative Literature

History 

 Omer Bartov – Samuel Pisar Professor of Holocaust and Genocide Studies
 Paul Buhle – Senior Lecturer Emeritus
 Richard Bushman – Postdoctoral Fellow in History and Psychology (1963-1965)
James T. Campbell – Professor of American Civilization, Africana Studies, and History (1999–2008)
 Deborah Cohen – Professor of History (2002–10)
Natalie Zemon Davis – Assistant Professor of History (1959–63); recipient of the 2012 National Humanities Medal
James N. Green – Carlos Manuel de Cespedes Professor of Modern Latin American History and Portuguese and Brazilian Studies
 Susan Ashbrook Harvey – Willard Prescott and Annie McClelland Smith Professor of History and Religion (1987–)
David Herlihy – Barnaby Conrad and Mary Critchfield Keeney Professor and Professor of History
R. Ross Holloway – Elisha Benjamin Andrews Professor Emeritus and Professor Emeritus of Central Mediterranean Archaeology
Evelyn Hu-DeHart — Professor of History and Professor of American Studies
 Tara Nummedal – John Nickoll Provost’s Professor of History
 Forrest McDonald – Professor of History (1959–67)
Edmund Morgan – Associate Professor of Colonial History (1946–55)
 James T. Patterson – Ford Foundation Professor Emeritus and Professor Emeritus of History (1972–2002); winner of the 1997 Bancroft Prize
 Joan Wallach Scott – Founding Director of the Pembroke Center, Nancy Duke Lewis University Professor (1981–85)
Morton Smith – Assistant Professor of Biblical Literature (1950–55)
 John L. Thomas (Ph.D. 1961) – George L. Littlefield Professor of American History Emeritus; winner of the 1964 Bancroft Prize
 Gordon S. Wood – Alva O. Way University Professor and Professor of History; Pulitzer Prize for History winner, The Radicalism of the American Revolution
 Karin Wulf – Professor of History, Beatrice and Julio Mario Santo Domingo Director and Librarian of the John Carter Brown Library

Modern Culture and Media 

 Ariella Azoulay – Professor of Comparative Literature and Modern Culture and Media
 Tina Campt – Owen F. Walker Professor of Humanities and Professor of Modern Culture and Media
 Wendy Hui Kyong Chun – Professor of Modern Culture and Media (2005–18)
Tony Cokes – Professor of Modern Culture and Media
 Joan Copjec – Professor of Modern Culture and Media
 Mary Ann Doane – George Hazard Crooker Professor of Modern Culture and Media
Bonnie Honig – Nancy Duke Lewis Professor of Modern Culture and Media and Political Science
 Robert Scholes – Research Professor of Modern Culture and Media; President, Modern Language Association; author, The Rise and Fall of English; co-author, The Nature of Narrative
 Leslie Thornton – Professor Emerita of Modern Culture and Media

Philosophy 

 Nomy Arpaly – Professor of Philosophy
Jason Brennan – Assistant Professor of Philosophy (2006–2011); author of Against Democracy
Dan W. Brock – Charles C. Tillinghast, Jr. University Professor and Professor Emeritus of Philosophy (1969–2002)
Roderick Chisholm (A.B. 1938) – Andrew W. Mellon Chair in the Humanities and Professor of Philosophy
 Joel Feinberg – Assistant Professor of Philosophy (1955–57)
 Mary Louise Gill – David Benedict Professor of Classics and Philosophy
 Paul Guyer – Jonathan Nelson Professor of Humanities and Philosophy
Christopher S. Hill – William Herbert Perry Faunce Professor of Philosophy
Jaegwon Kim – William Herbert Perry Faunce Professor of Philosophy; philosopher of mind, action theorist
Charles Larmore – W. Duncan MacMillan Family Professor of the Humanities and Professor of Philosophy
Felicia Nimue Ackerman – Professor of Philosophy
 Martha Nussbaum – Professor of Philosophy (1985–95); philosopher, authored The Fragility of Goodness while teaching at Brown
 Bernard Reginster – Romeo Elton Professor of Natural Theology
 Ernest Sosa – philosopher, epistemologist

Natural sciences

Biology 

 David Berson – Sidney A. Fox and Dorothea Doctors Fox Professor of Ophthalmology and Visual Science, discovered third photoreceptor in the eye (in addition to rods and cones)
Elizabeth L. Brainerd – Robert P. Brown Professor of Biology and Professor of Medical Science
David E. Cane – Vernon K. Krieble Professor Emeritus of Chemistry and Professor Emeritus of Molecular Biology, Cell Biology, and Biochemistry
Anne Fausto-Sterling (Ph.D. 1970) – Nancy Duke Lewis Professor Emerita of Biology
 Judy Liu – Sidney A. Fox and Dorothea Doctors Fox Associate Professor of Ophthalmology and Visual Science
 Kenneth R. Miller (Sc.B. 1970) – Professor of Biology; supporter of evolution involved in numerous public debates and trials about the teaching of intelligent design in schools
Masatoshi Nei – Professor of Biology (1969–72); recipient of the Kyoto Prize in Basic Sciences (2013)

Neuroscience 

 John Donoghue (Ph.D. 1979) – Henry Merritt Wriston Professor of Neuroscience, Professor of Engineering
 Michael J. Frank – Edgar L. Marston Professor of Psychology, Director of the Center for Computational Brain Science
 Leigh Hochberg (B.Sc. 1990) – L. Herbert Ballou University Professor of Engineering
 Diane Lipscombe – Thomas J. Watson, Sr. Professor of Science, Professor of Neuroscience, Reliance Dhirubhai Ambani Director of the Robert J. and Nancy D. Carney Institute for Brain Science
 Christopher I. Moore – Professor of Neuroscience
Michael Paradiso (Ph.D. 1984) – Sidney A. Fox and Dorothea Doctors Fox Professor of Ophthalmology and Visual Science and Professor of Neuroscience

Chemistry 
Chris Abell  – SERC NATO Postdoctoral Fellow in Chemistry (1982–83) 
Raymond Fuoss – Assistant Professor of Chemistry (1932–36)
Charles A. Kraus – Professor of Chemistry (1924–1946); consultant for the Manhattan Project, recipient of the Priestley Medal and Franklin Medal
Lars Onsager – Research Instructor in Chemistry (1928–33); Nobel laureate (Chemistry 1968), for discovering Onsager reciprocal relations
John Ross – Assistant Professor of Chemistry (1953–65)
Lai-Sheng Wang – Jesse H. and Louisa D. Sharpe Metcalf Professor; chemist

Cognitive and psychological sciences 

 Sheila Blumstein – Albert D. Mead Professor of Cognitive, Linguistic and Psychological Sciences
Judson A. Brewer – Director of Research and Innovation at the Mindfulness Center, and Professor of Behavioral and Social Sciences
 Mary Carskadon – Adjunct Professor of Cognitive, Linguistic and Psychological Sciences
Russell Church – Edgar L. Marston Professor Emeritus of Psychology
William Damon – Professor of Education (1989–97)
Philip Lieberman – George Hazard Crooker University Professor Emeritus
Jeffrey Moussaieff Masson – author and psychoanalyst
William H. Warren – Chancellor's Professor of Cognitive, Linguistic and Psychological Sciences

Earth sciences 

Kim Cobb – Professor of Environment and Society and Professor of Earth, Environmental and Planetary Sciences
Karen M. Fischer – Louis and Elizabeth Scherck Distinguished Professor of the Geological Sciences
Meredith G. Hastings – Professor of Environment and Society and Earth, Environmental and Planetary Sciences
James W. Head (Ph.D. 1969) – Louis and Elizabeth Scherck Distinguished Professor Emeritus of the Geological Sciences
Timothy D. Herbert – Henry L. Doherty Professor of Oceanography, Professor of Earth, Environmental, and Planetary Sciences
John Imbrie – Professor Emeritus of Geological Sciences
Amanda Lynch – Sloan Lindemann and George Lindemann, Jr. Distinguished Professor of Environment and Society and Professor of Earth, Environmental and Planetary Sciences
James M. Russell – Chair of Earth, Environmental, and Planetary Sciences
Peter H. Schultz – Professor Emeritus of Geological Sciences, Professor of Earth, Environmental, and Planetary Sciences

Medicine and public health 
Eli Y. Adashi – Professor of Medical Science, 5th Dean of Medicine and Biological Sciences
Patrick Aebischer – Associate Professor of Medical Sciences (1984–1992); President emeritus of the École Polytechnique Fédérale de Lausanne
Lorin Crawford – RGSS Assistant Professor of Biostatistics
Qian Chen – Chair Professor in Orthopaedic Research
Esther Choo – Adjunct Associate Professor of Emergency Medicine
David F. Duncan – Clinical Associate Professor of Medicine; epidemiologist and addictionologist
Alison Field – Professor of Epidemiology
Constantine Gatsonis – Henry Ledyard Goddard University Professor of Biostatistics
Mukesh Jain – Dean of Biological Sciences, Dean of Medicine at the Warren Alpert Medical School, Frank L. Day Professor of Biology
Ashish Jha – Dean of the School of Public Health, Professor of Health Services, Policy and Practice (2020–)
 Peter D. Kramer – Clinical Professor of Psychiatry and Human Behavior – author, Listening to Prozac, Against Depression 
Bess Marcus – 2nd Dean of the School of Public Health (2017-2020), Professor of Behavioral and Social Sciences
Jennifer Nuzzo – Professor of Epidemiology
Megan Ranney (M.P.H. 2010) – Warren Alpert Endowed Professor of Department of Emergency Medicine and Academic Dean of the Brown University School of Public Health
Christopher H. Schmid – Professor of Biostatistics
Peter A. Stewart – Professor of Medical Science 
Benjamin Waterhouse – Professor of Natural History (1784–1791); co-founder of Harvard Medical School, first doctor to test the smallpox vaccine in the United States

Physics 
Stephon Alexander (Sc.M. 1995, Sc.M. 1996, Ph.D. 2000) – Professor of Physics
Carl Barus – Hazard Professor of Physics (1895–1926)
Léon Brillouin – Professor of Physics (1942–43); founder of modern solid state physics
Manuel Cardona – Associate Professor of Physics (1964–71); one of the eight most cited physicists since 1970
Leon Neil Cooper – Thomas J. Watson, Sr. Professor of Physics; Nobel laureate (Physics, 1972), father of superconductivity, and developer of the BCM theory of synaptic plasticity in neuroscience
Richard Gaitskell – Hazard Professor of Physics, Director of the Center for Fundamental Physics
Sylvester James Gates – Ford Foundation Professor of Physics; physicist specializing in superstring theory
Gerald Guralnik – Chancellor's Professor of Physics; co-discoverer of the Higgs mechanism, Sakurai Prize winner
Leo Kadanoff – Professor of Physics (1969–78); recipient of the National Medal of Science
John M. Kosterlitz – Harrison E. Farnsworth Professor of Physics (1982–); Nobel laureate (2016, Physics)
Robert Bruce Lindsay (A.B., Sc.M. 1920) – Hazard Professor of Physics; recipient of the ASA Gold Medal
Sidney R. Nagel – Research Associate (1974–76)
Meenakshi Narain – Professor of Physics
Nicholas Read  – Research Fellow (1985-1986)
John Lighton Synge  – Visiting Professor (1941)
Anastasia Volovich – Professor of Physics
Vesna F. Mitrović – L. Herbert Ballou University Professor of Physics & Professor of Engineering

Formal sciences

Computer science 
 R. Iris Bahar – Professor of Computer Science
Eugene Charniak – University Professor Emeritus of Computer Science (1978–)
Thomas Dean – Professor Emeritus of Computer Science
 Maurice Herlihy – An Wang Professor of Computer Science
John F. Hughes – Associate Chair of Computer Science
Leslie P. Kaelbling – Professor of Computer Science (1991–99)
Shriram Krishnamurthi – Professor of Computer Science
David Laidlaw (B.Sc. 1983) – Professor of Computer Science
Michael L. Littman (Ph.D. 1996) – University Professor of Computer Science
Franco P. Preparata – An Wang Professor of Computer Science Emeritus
John E. Savage – An Wang Professor Emeritus of Computer Science (2011–)
 Robert Sedgewick (Sc.B. 1968, Sc.M. 1970) – Professor of Computer Science (1975–85)
Roberto Tamassia – Plastech Professor of Computer Science
 Eli Upfal – Rush Hawkins Professor of Computer Science
Andries van Dam – Thomas J. Watson Jr. University Professor of Technology and Education and Professor of Computer Science, Vice President for Research (2002–06); computer graphics and hypertext pioneer
 Jeffrey Vitter – Professor of Computer Science (1980–92); 17th Chancellor of the University of Mississippi
Peter Wegner – Professor Emeritus of Computer Science
 Stanley Zdonik – Professor of Computer Science

Mathematics 
Dan Abramovich – L. Herbert Ballou University Professor of Mathematics
Thomas Banchoff – Professor Emeritus of Mathematics
Mary Cartwright  – Visiting Professor (1968–69)
Herbert Federer – Florence Pirce Grant University Professor (1945–85)
William Feller – Associate Professor (1939–45); mathematician of probability theory, winner of the National Medal of Science
David Gale – Professor of Mathematics (1950–65)
Ulf Grenander – L. Herbert Ballou University Professor, originator of pattern theory 
Richard Kenyon – William R. Kenan Jr. University Professor of Mathematics (2007–19)
Hans Lewy – Research Associate (1933–35)
Marston Morse – Associate Professor of Mathematics (1925–6); namesake of Morse theory
Katsumi Nomizu – Professor of Mathematics (1960–95); co-author of Foundations of Differential Geometry (1963, 1969)
Jill Pipher – Elisha Benjamin Andrews Professor of Mathematics; first director of ICERM
George Pólya – Visiting Professor (1940–42)
Richard Schwartz – Chancellor's Professor of Mathematics
Walter A. Strauss – L. Herbert Ballou University Professor of Mathematics
Jacob Tamarkin – Professor of Mathematics (1927–45)

Applied mathematics 
Maurice Anthony Biot – Professor of Applied Mathematics (1946–52); recipient of the Timoshenko Medal
George F. Carrier – Professor of Applied Mathematics (1941–48); recipient of the Timoshenko Medal
Carlos Castillo-Chavez – Provost Visiting Professor of Applied Mathematics
Constantine Dafermos – Alumni-Alumnae University Professor of Applied Mathematics
Philip J. Davis – Professor Emeritus of Applied Mathematics; co-author of The Mathematical Experience
Daniel C. Drucker – Professor of Applied Mathematics and of Engineering (1946–68); recipient of the Timoshenko Medal, National Medal of Science, ASME Medal
Wendell Fleming – University Professor Emeritus and Professor Emeritus of Applied Mathematics and Mathematics
Huajian Gao – Walter H. Annenberg Professor Emeritus of Engineering (2005–)
Stuart Geman – James Manning Professor of Applied Mathematics
David Gottlieb – Ford Foundation Professor of Applied Mathematics
Albert E. Green – Visiting Professor; recipient of the Timoshenko Medal
George Karniadakis – James Manning Professor of Applied Mathematics
Harold J. Kushner – L. Herbert Ballou University Professor Emeritus of Applied Mathematics and Engineering
Chia-Chiao Lin – Associate Professor of Applied Mathematics (1945–47); recipient of the Timoshenko Medal
 – Professor of Applied Mathematics (1948–62); recipient of the Timoshenko Medal
Solomon Lefschetz – Visiting Professor of Applied Mathematics (1964–68)
David Mumford – Professor Emeritus of Applied Mathematics, recipient of the Fields Medal, MacArthur Fellow
Alan Needleman – Professor Emeritus of Engineering; recipient of the Timoshenko Medal
William Prager – Professor of Applied Mathematics; recipient of the Timoshenko Medal
Kavita Ramanan (M.Sc. 1993, Ph.D. 1998) – Roland George Dwight Richardson University Professor of Applied Mathematics
James R. Rice – L. Herbert Ballou Professor of Theoretical and Applied Mechanics (1964–1981); recipient of the Timoshenko Medal
Ronald Rivlin – Professor of Applied Mathematics (1953–67); recipient of the Timoshenko Medal
Björn Sandstede – Alumni-Alumnae University Professor of Applied Mathematics
Chi-Wang Shu – Theodore B. Stowell University Professor of Applied Mathematics
Eli Sternberg – Professor of Applied Mathematics; recipient of the Timoshenko Medal

Social sciences 
Lina Fruzzetti – Professor of Anthropology
David Kertzer (A.B. 1969) – Paul Dupee University Professor of Social Science; recipient of the Pulitzer Prize
Theodore R. Sizer – Professor and Chair of Education (1983–97)

Political science and international studies 

 Nadje Sadig Al-Ali – Robert Family Professor of International Studies and Professor of Anthropology and Middle East Studies
J. Brian Atwood – Visiting Scholar in International and Public Affairs
Thomas J. Biersteker – Director of the Watson Institute for International Studies and Henry R. Luce Professor of Transnational Organizations (1992–2006)
Richard Boucher – Senior Fellow in International and Public Affairs; former deputy secretary-general of the OECD,
Fernando Henrique Cardoso – Professor-at-large of International Studies;  34th President of Brazil
Lincoln Chafee (A.B. 1975) – Distinguished Visiting Fellow in International Relations; former Republican member of the United States Senate
Ross Cheit – Professor of Political Science and of International and Public Affairs
James Der Derian – Institute Research Professor of International Studies
Patrick Heller – Professor of Sociology and International and Public Affairs
 Richard Holbrooke (A.B. 1962) – Professor-at-large; U.S. Special Representative for Afghanistan and Pakistan, 22nd U.S. Ambassador to the U.N.; U.S. Ambassador to Germany
Sergei Khrushchev – Senior Fellow in International Studies; son of Nikita Sergeyevich Khrushchev
Jim Yong Kim (A.B. 1981) – Senior Fellow in International and Public Affairs; 17th President, Dartmouth College, 12th President of the World Bank
Stephen Kinzer – Senior Fellow in International and Public Affairs at the Watson Institute for International and Public Affairs
Ricardo Lagos – Professor-at-large of International Studies;  31st President of Chile
Richard M. Locke – Provost and Schreiber Family Professor of Political Science and International and Public Affairs
 Catherine Lutz – Thomas J. Watson, Jr. Family Professor of Anthropology and International Studies
 Rose McDermott – David and Marianna Fisher University Professor of International Relations
 James Morone – John Hazen White Professor of Public Policy
Eric M. Patashnik – Julis-Rabinowitz Professor of Public Policy
 Tom Perez (1983) – Senior Fellow in International and Public Affairs; 

Romano Prodi – Adjunct Professor of International and Public Affairs; 10th President of the European Commission and two-time Prime Minister of Italy
Edward Steinfeld – Dean's Professor of China Studies and Professor of Political Science
 Michael Steele – Senior Fellow in International and Public Affairs; seventh lieutenant governor of Maryland
Arvind Subramanian – Senior Fellow in International and Public Affairs; Chief Economic Advisor to the Government of India (2014–18)
Galina Starovoitova – Watson Distinguished Visiting Professor 1994–1998; member of Russian Duma; leader of reformist Democratic Russia party; assassinated November 20, 1998
J. Ann Tickner – Visiting Scholar (1997); Visiting Adjunct Professor (2004–09)
Ashutosh Varshney – Sol Goldman Professor of International Studies and the Social Sciences
 Margaret Weir – Wilson Professor of International and Public Affairs and Political Science
 Darrell M. West – John Hazen White Professor of Public Policy and Political Science and Director of the A. Alfred Taubman Center for Public Policy (2000–08), vice president and director of governance studies at the Brookings Institution;

Economics 

 Anna Aizer – Maurice R. Greenberg Professor of Economics
 Mark Blyth – William R. Rhodes '57 Professor of International Economics and Director of the Rhodes Center for International Economics and Finance
 Phillip D. Cagan – Professor of Economics (1959–66)
John Friedman – Professor of Economics, Chair of Economics and Professor of International and Public Affairs
 Oded Galor – Herbert H. Goldberger Professor of Economics, developer of the unified growth theory
 Peter Howitt – Professor Emeritus of Economics; co-originator of the Schumpeterian Paradigm with Philippe Aghion
Alvin Hansen, – Instructor in Economics (1916–19)
Rafael La Porta – Robert J. and Nancy D. Carney University Professor of Economics
Ross Levine –  James and Merryl Tisch Professor of Economics; advisor to the United States Treasury, Federal Reserve System, and World Bank; highly cited economist, ranked 10th in the world, according to RePEc
Glenn Loury – Merton P. Stoltz Professor of Social Sciences and Professor of Economics
Hyman Minsky – Associate Professor of Economics (1949–1958), namesake of the Minsky moment
Emily Oster – JJE Goldman Sachs University Professor of Economics and International and Public Affairs
William Poole – Herbert H. Goldberger Professor of Economics (1974–1998); President of the Federal Reserve Bank of St Louis (1998–2008)
Susanne Schennach – Professor of Economics
Roberto Serrano – Harrison S. Kravis University Professor of Economics
Jesse Shapiro – George S. and Nancy B. Parker Professor of Economics (2015–2021)
Vernon L. Smith – Professor of Economics (1967–68); Nobel laureate (2002, Economic Sciences) 
George Stigler – Professor of Economics (1946–47); Nobel laureate (1982, Economic Sciences) 
David N. Weil (A.B. 1982) – James and Merryl Tisch Professor of Economics
Ivo Welch – CV Starr Chair of Finance and Economics (2004–11)

Sociology 

 Sandra Lynn Barnes – C.V. Starr Professor of Sociology, Chair of Sociology
 Prudence Carter – Sarah and Joseph Jr. Dowling Professor of Sociology
Scott Frickel – Professor of Environment and Society and Sociology
 Dennis Hogan – Robert E. Turner Distinguished Professor Emeritus of Population Studies
Jose Itzigsohn – Professor of Sociology
 J. Timmons Roberts – Professor of Environment and Society and Sociology
 Susan Short - Robert E. Turner Distinguished Professor of Population Studies
Mark C. Suchman – Professor of Sociology (2008–)
 Lester Frank Ward – Professor of Sociology; first president of the American Sociological Association and "father of American sociology"
Dennis Wrong – Assistant Professor of Sociology (1956–61); during his tenure, Wrong published “The Oversocialized Conception of Man in Modern Sociology”

Visual and performing arts 

 Shura Baryshnikov – head of Movement at the Brown University/Trinity Repertory Company MFA program
 Wendy Edwards – painter; Professor of Art (retired)
 Shigeko Kubota – Artist in Residence (1974–83), avant-garde Japanese artist associated with Fluxus
 Ron Nelson – composer; Professor of Music (retired)
 Paul Phillips – conductor, composer, and world's leading scholar on the music of author Anthony Burgess

Unclassified 
 Kermit S. Champa, art historian, Andrea V. Rosenthal Professor of the History of Art and Architecture
 Eugene Jarecki, Visiting Fellow at the Watson Institute for International and Public Affairs
 Otto Neugebauer, historian of mathematics; Professor of the History of Mathematics
 Edward L. Widmer, historian, Clinton administration speechwriter; Director, John Carter Brown Library

Deans

Dean of the College 

 Sheila Blumstein – Dean of the College (1998–2000)
 Nancy Dunbar – Dean of the College (1998–2000)
 Paul Armstrong – Dean of the College (2001–06)
 Katherine Bergeron – Dean of the College (2006–13); 11th President of Connecticut College (2014–)
 Maud Mandel – Dean of the College (2014–18); 18th President of Williams College (2018–)
 Rashid Zia – Dean of the College (2018)

Provosts 

 Samuel T. Arnold (1913, A.M. 1914, Ph.D. 1916) – First Provost (1949–56)
 Zenas R. Bliss (1918) – Second Provost (1957–65)
 Merton P. Stoltz (A.M. 1936) – Third Provost (1966–78)
 Maurice Glicksman – Fourth Provost (1978–90)
 Frank G. Rothman – Fifth Provost (1990–94)
 James R. Pomerantz – Sixth Provost (1995–98)
 William S. Simmons (A.B. 1960) – Seventh Provost (1998–99)
 Kathryn Spoehr (A.B. 1969) – Eighth Provost (1999–2002)
 Robert Zimmer – Ninth Provost (2002–06); 13th President of the University of Chicago (2006–2021)
 David Kertzer (A.B. 1969) – 10th Provost (2006–11)
 Mark Schlissel – 11th Provost (2011–14); 14th President of the University of Michigan (2014–2022)
 Vicki Colvin – 12th Provost (2014–15)
 Richard M. Locke – 13th Provost (2015–)

Presidents 

 
James Manning (1765–1791)
 Jonathan Maxcy (1792–1802)
 Asa Messer (1802–1826)
 Francis Wayland (1827–1855)
 Barnas Sears (1855–1867)
 Alexis Caswell (1868–1872)
 Ezekiel Gilman Robinson (1872–1889)
 Elisha Benjamin Andrews (1889–1898)
 William H. P. Faunce (1899–1929)
 Clarence Augustus Barbour (1929–1937)
 Henry Merritt Wriston (1937–1955)
 Barnaby Conrad Keeney (1955–1966)
 Ray L. Heffner (1966–1969)
 Donald Frederick Hornig (1970–1976)
 Howard Robert Swearer (1977–1988)
 Vartan Gregorian (1989–1997)
 Gordon Gee (1998–2000)
 Sheila Blumstein (interim, February 2000–July 2001)
 Ruth Simmons (2001–2012)
 Christina Paxson (2012–)

References 

Lists of people by university or college in Rhode Island
People